Claus Sendlinger (born 1963) is the founder and former CEO of Design Hotels AG (Börse München: LBA) and co-founder of Slow. Until 2018, Sendlinger was the CEO & president of Design Hotels, a publicly traded hospitality services company representing a network of more than 170 independently owned hotels in 40 countries and with offices in London, Barcelona, New York City, Singapore, Bali, Tokyo and Perth in addition to its headquarters in Berlin. After leading Design Hotels for 25 years, Sendlinger stepped down and now continues to serve as advisor and mentor to the Executive Board of Design Hotels.

Biography
Born in Augsburg, Germany, in 1963, Sendlinger began his career in event planning and PR for hotels and clubs. In 1987, he founded CO-ORDINATES GmbH, an incentives and events agency. This formed the basis for the foundation of lebensart global networks AG as a marketing and technology provider for the hospitality industry based in Germany.

In 2002, Condé Nast Traveler named Sendlinger in their Top 50 list of world tourism experts, in the category of most creative and innovative international tourism entrepreneurs.

See also

 Design Hotels AG
Slow

References

External links
“Is travel really the enemy?” by Claire Wrathall, Financial Times, 14 September 2007“Claus Sendlinger: Trendspotting” by Ruth Elkins, The Independent UK, 20 August 2005
 “Fast Talk: Claus Sendlinger” by Hillary Geronemus, Travel + Leisure, January 2004
 “Audio Interview With Claus Sendlinger, CEO of Lebensart Global Networks - Sharing His Views On Lifestyle Hospitality And The L-Community”, Hospitalitynet.org, 29 May 2002

German chief executives
Living people
1963 births